The 1935 Paris–Roubaix was the 36th edition of the Paris–Roubaix, a classic one-day cycle race in France. The single day event was held on 21 April 1935 and stretched  from Paris to its end in a velodrome in Roubaix. The winner was Gaston Rebry from Belgium.

Results

References

Paris–Roubaix
Paris–Roubaix
Paris–Roubaix
Paris–Roubaix